Ubiquitin-specific protease 14 is an enzyme that in humans is encoded by the USP14 gene.

This gene encodes a member of the ubiquitin-specific processing (UBP) family of proteases that is a deubiquitinating enzyme (DUB) with His and Cys domains. This protein is located in the cytoplasm and cleaves the ubiquitin moiety from ubiquitin-fused precursors and ubiquitinylated proteins. Mice with a mutation that results in reduced expression of the ortholog of this protein are retarded for growth, develop severe tremors by 2 to 3 weeks of age followed by hindlimb paralysis and death by 6 to 10 weeks of age. Alternate transcriptional splice variants, encoding different isoforms, have been characterized.

Interactions 

USP14 has been shown to interact with CXCR4.

References

Further reading

External links